The men's road race at the 1948 UCI Road World Championships was the 15th edition of the event. The race took place on Sunday 22 August 1948 in Valkenburg, the Netherlands. The race was won by Briek Schotte of Belgium.

Final classification

References

Men's Road Race
UCI Road World Championships – Men's road race